Dieter Matthaei (born 1 February 1949 in Clausthal-Zellerfeld, Germany) is a German radiotherapist and internist.

Matthaei studied physics and medicine at the universities of Berlin and Göttingen. In 1977, he received his doctorate from the University of Göttingen. He was from 1983 to 1987 a research associate at the Max-Planck-Institut für biophysikalische Chemie in Göttingen and is now medical specialist for internal medicine in Göttingen.

Matthaei worked at the University of Göttingen and at the Max Planck Institute for Nuclear magnetic resonance in biological systems.  He was looking for a scientific development of NMR techniques based on magnetic resonance imagery. With Axel Haase and Jens Frahm he succeeded in 1985 with the invention of rapid image proceedings FLASH MRI (fast low angle shot) a revolutionary breakthrough that allows the use of MRI imaging for clinical diagnosis. It enabled the first real coherent representation of body functions.

He is the founder and editor of  Magnetic Resonance Materials in Physics, Biology and Medicine (MAGMA).

Sources 
 
 
  (first scientific publication of FLASH)
Frahm J, Haase A, Hänicke W, Merboldt KD, Matthaei D. Hochfrequenz-Impuls und Gradienten-Impuls-Verfahren zur Aufnahme von schnellen NMR-Tomogrammen unter Benutzung von Gradientenechos. Deutsche Patentanmeldung P 35 04 734.8 vom 12. Februar 1985

External links
 
 

Living people
1949 births
20th-century German physicists
German medical researchers
German radiologists
Physicians from Lower Saxony
21st-century German physicists